Fucun (富村镇) may refer to:

 Fucun, Hebei, China
 Fucun, Yunnan, in Fuyuan County, Yunnan, China